Melicope polybotrya  is a species of shrub or small tree in the family Rutaceae and is endemic to Lord Howe Island. It has trifoliate leaves and green flowers borne in short panicles in leaf axils.

Description
The plants are dioecious, with male and female flowers on separate plants.

Taxonomy
This species was first formally described in 1871 by Charles Moore and Ferdinand von Mueller who gave it the name Euodia polybotrya. The description was published in Fragmenta phytographiae Australiae from specimens collected on Mount Lidgbird. In 2001, Thomas Gordon Hartley changed the name to Melicope polybotrya in the journal Allertonia. The specific epithet comes from the Greek polys (“many”) and botrys (“bunch”), referring to the clusters of flowers in the type specimen.

Distribution and habitat
Melicope polybotrya grows in sheltered forest and is relatively common, especially at lower elevations and is endemic to Lord Howe Island.

References

polybotrya
Endemic flora of Lord Howe Island
Plants described in 1871
Sapindales of Australia
Taxa named by Charles Moore
Taxa named by Ferdinand von Mueller